Aerosul Linhas Aéreas is a Brazilian airline based in Arapongas.

History
On February 10, 2021, ANAC issued the concession grant for operating regular and non-regular public air transport services in Brazil. The airline had its maiden flight on June 16, 2021.

Destinations
Below were the destinations of Aerosul. The airline is not operating regular flights anymore.

Fleet
Aerosul fleet consists of the following aircraft (as of March 2022):

See also
List of airlines of Brazil

References

External links

Airlines of Brazil
Airlines established in 2020
2020 establishments in Brazil
Companies of Brazil